The lacrimal fossa (or fossa for lacrimal gland) is located on the inferior surface of each orbital plate of the frontal bone. It is smooth and concave, and presents, laterally, underneath the zygomatic process, a shallow depression for the lacrimal gland.

See also
 Fossa for lacrimal sac

References

External links
 1519844 - Stedman's Online Medical Dictionary at Lippincott Williams and Wilkins

Bones of the head and neck